Wildwood is an unincorporated community in Koochiching County, Minnesota, United States; located within the Pine Island State Forest.

The community is located between Northome and Effie; near the junction of State Highway 1 (MN 1) and County Road 27.  The boundary line between Koochiching and Itasca counties is nearby.  Wildwood is located within ZIP code 56661 based in Northome.

Wildwood is located along the boundary line between South Koochiching Unorganized Territory and Northome Unorganized Territory.  Caldwell Brook flows through the community.

Nearby places include Northome, Mizpah, Effie, and Bigfork.  Wildwood is located 15 miles east of Northome.  Wildwood is 18 miles west of Effie; and 74 miles southwest of International Falls.

References

 Official State of Minnesota Highway Map – 2011/2012 edition
 Mn/DOT map of Koochiching County – Sheet 1 – 2011 edition

Unincorporated communities in Minnesota
Unincorporated communities in Koochiching County, Minnesota